Gundam Wing: Endless Waltz, known in Japan as , is the sequel to Mobile Suit Gundam Wing, both of which are set in the "After Colony" timeline, an alternate universe to that of the original Mobile Suit Gundam series. Aside from being a continuation to the Gundam Wing TV series, it also reveals details regarding the pasts of the five Gundam pilots and the true objective behind "Operation Meteor."

Endless Waltz originally premiered in Japan as a three-part OVA in 1997. It was later released as a theatrical compilation film in 1998, including additional scenes and an altered musical score.

Synopsis
It is the year After Colony 196, and the battles between Earth and the space colonies have ended. Treize Khushrenada is dead and OZ has come to an end. This gives birth to the Earth Sphere Unified Nation (ESUN) and the Preventers. Seeing they won't be needed anymore, the Gundam pilots (except Chang Wufei) send their suits into the sun. However, this peace would not last, for a rebellion occurs on the newly completed colony, L3 X-18999. Led by seven-year-old Mariemaia Khushrenada, Treize's illegitimate daughter, the rebellion kidnaps Relena Darlian, now the Vice Foreign Minister of the ESUN, during a diplomatic mission to X-18999. As the Gundam pilots investigate further, they discover that Mariemaia is merely a puppet controlled by her grandfather Dekim Barton, a former advisor to martyred colony leader Heero Yuy, who is using X-18999 to go through with the original Operation Meteor, as a contingency plan in case the ESUN doesn't comply. The Gundam pilots must prevent Dekim from seizing power over the ESUN. The Gundams are retrieved from their course to sun to Earth's orbit thanks to Quatre and the Maganacs. The pilots use their Gundams one last time to fight against Dekim's forces, not killing anyone. In the end, Dekim is killed by one of his own soldiers, Earth and its colonies are at peace once again and all mobile suits (including the Gundams) are forever destroyed and never seen again.

Characters

Heero Yuy

Pilot of the XXXG-00W0 Wing Gundam Zero, who was code-named after the assassinated pacifist of the same name. Though he brought an end to the war between Earth and the colonies, Heero must now prevent the Mariemaia Army from disrupting the peace.
Relena Darlian

An ally of the Gundam pilots and the strongest political advocate for peace between Earth and the colonies, who is kidnapped by the Mariemaia Army.
Duo Maxwell

Pilot of the XXXG-01D2 Gundam Deathscythe Hell, who assists his fellow Gundam pilots in maintaining the peace they fought so hard to attain.
Trowa Barton

Pilot of the XXXG-01H2 Gundam Heavyarms Kai, who infiltrates the Mariemaia Army in order to prevent its revised version of Operation Meteor.
Quatre Raberba Winner
}
Pilot of the XXXG-01SR2 Gundam Sandrock Kai, who comes up with the idea of sending the Gundams into the Sun, but is forced to retrieve them after the Mariemaia Army declares war on the Earth.
Chang Wufei

Pilot of the XXXG-01S2 Altron Gundam, who joins forces with the Mariemaia Army and becomes an enemy toward the other Gundam pilots.
Zechs Merquise

A former enemy of the Gundam pilots, now their ally and a member of the Preventers (code name: "Wind"), as well as the pilot of the new OZ-00MS2B Tallgeese III mobile suit.
Lucrezia Noin

An ally of the Gundam pilots and a member of the Preventers (code name: "Fire").
Sally Po

Another ally of the Gundam pilots and a member of the Preventers (code name: "Water").
Lady Une

Another former enemy of the Gundam pilots, now their ally and the head of the Preventers (code name: "Gold").
Mariemaia Khushrenada

The young daughter of the deceased Treize Khushrenada, who is manipulated by her grandfather Dekim Barton into leading a rebellion against the Earth with the intentions of conquering it.
Narrator

Mecha redesigns
One of the most notable features of Endless Waltz was the massive redesigns all five of the Gundams from the end of the Gundam Wing TV series received, courtesy of the artist Hajime Katoki. The Gundams in Endless Waltz have more stylized appearances, reflected in the even more demonic design of the Gundam Deathscythe Hell, the more dragon-like design of the Altron Gundam, and the new "angel-winged" design of the Wing Zero Gundam. Despite the dramatically different designs of the Gundams, the story in Endless Waltz retcons them as if the original designs from the TV series never existed. However, this changed after the release of the Glory of Losers manga series.

Music

Theme songs

OVA Ending Theme: "White Reflection" by Two-Mix
Movie Ending Theme: "Last Impression" by Two-Mix

Distribution
In North America, Endless Waltz premiered on Canada's YTV on September 11, 2000 and on Cartoon Network in the U.S. on November 10, 2000. It was later released to VHS, UMD,  and DVD by Bandai Entertainment, with the DVD edition containing both the OVA and compilation film versions on one disc. Due to the closure of Bandai Entertainment, the OVA and film went out-of-print. On October 11, 2014 at their 2014 New York Comic-Con panel, Sunrise announced they will be releasing all of the Gundam franchise, including Endless Waltz in North America though distribution from Right Stuf Inc., beginning in Spring 2015. Right Stuf had re-released Endless Waltz on Blu-ray and DVD in December 2017.

Reception
The initial airing of the OVA on November 10, 2000, was Cartoon Network's second highest-rated program ever at the time, only being topped by the Funimation's in-house dub of Dragon Ball Z. Helen McCarthy in 500 Essential Anime Movies commented that "the giant robot fights are as good as ever" and that "the art direction and design is excellent".

References

External links
  
 
 

1997 anime OVAs
1998 anime films
Bandai Entertainment anime titles
Wing Endless Waltz
Kadokawa Shoten manga
Kodansha manga
Kōichi Tokita
Impact events in fiction
Endless Waltz
Sunrise (company)
Tokyopop titles
Viz Media manga
Works about coups d'état